The Das Land Südtirol is a monthly German-language publication of the Südtiroler Landtag (South Tyrolian Landtag) in South Tyrol. The journal is published, with the exception of January and August, ten times a year in the first week of the month. Each edition features a several-pages long summary of the previous sessions of the assembly. Subscription of the publication is free of charge.

See also 
Civic Network of South Tyrol

External links 
The South Tyrolean Landtag - Das Land Südtirol

German-language mass media in South Tyrol
Mass media in Bolzano
Government gazettes
Government of South Tyrol